Carl Julius Rudolf Moll (23 April 1861 – 13 April 1945) was a prominent art nouveau painter active in Vienna at the start of the 20th century. He was one of the artists of the Vienna Secession who took inspiration from the pointillist techniques of French Impressionists. He was an early supporter of the Nazis and committed suicide as Soviet forces approached Vienna at the end of World War II.

Life and career 

Moll was born in Vienna, Austria. He studied art at the Academy of Fine Arts Vienna.  He was a student of Christian Griepenkerl and of Emil Jakob Schindler (the father of Alma Mahler-Werfel née Schindler). After his teacher's 1892 death, Moll married Schindler's widow, Anna (née von Bergen); they had been lovers for some time.

Moll was a founder-member of the Vienna Secession in 1897 and, in 1903 encouraged the use of the Belvedere Gallery to show exhibitions of modern Austrian art. In 1905 he, along with Gustav Klimt, left the Secession, although Moll continued to be involved with the exhibition of art in Vienna including the first exhibition in Vienna of the work of Vincent van Gogh (the second painting above the sideboard in his 1906 self-portrait is Van Gogh's Portrait of the Artist's Mother).  His paintings are characterized by the use of pointillist techniques within a strict organization of the surface of the painting.

He committed suicide by poison at the end of World War II, in Vienna, along with his daughter Maria and son-in-law Richard Eberstaller, a Viennese lawyer. All three had been early Nazi Party supporters.

Auction records 
On 21 June 2013, the online auction house Auctionata in Berlin sold Moll's Villa in Vienna for 240,000 Euros. Previously a smaller painting, a still-life entitled Speisezimmer I, from the Rau collection fetched 286,700 Euros at Lempertz, a world-record price for the artist.

The Viennese auction house Dorotheum sold his painting "Blick auf Nussdorf und Heiligenstadt in der Dämmerung" for 228,839 Euros on 27 November 2007.

In 2018, the National Gallery of Canada acquired the 1901 work At the Lunch Table, previously thought to have been lost in the 1930s. It had been owned by Siegmund Isaias Zollschan of Vienna, who was murdered in the Holocaust; he had sent it to a relative in Canada for safekeeping before the war, where it remained in family hands until acquired by the gallery.

In 2021, Freeman's Auctioneers & Appraisers in Philadelphia, USA sold Moll's "Weißes Interieur (White Interior)" for $4,756,000. This rediscovered masterpiece was Freeman's highest selling lot to date, surpassing the house's 2011 record of $3.1m achieved by an important Imperial white jade seal from the Qianlong period.

References

Bibliography 
 
 Edwin Lachnit. "Moll, Carl." In Grove Art Online. Oxford Art Online, (accessed January 9, 2012; subscription required).
 Tobias G. Natter, Gerbert Frodl (eds.): "Carl Moll. 1861-1945. Maler und Organisator", Vienna 1998, .

External links 
 
 Entry for Carl Moll on the Union List of Artist Names
 Biography, Literature and Works by Carl Moll
 ''Carl Moll: Catalogue Raisonné and Monograph

19th-century Austrian painters
19th-century Austrian male artists
Austrian male painters
20th-century Austrian painters
Artists who committed suicide
Members of the Vienna Secession
Artists from Vienna
Academy of Fine Arts Vienna alumni
1861 births
1945 deaths
Nazis who committed suicide in Austria
1945 suicides
20th-century Austrian male artists